Tolarno station is a station in west New South Wales situated about 440 km east-northeast of Adelaide, about 800 km west of Sydney. Peppora is at an altitude of approximately 57m. Tolarno Station is one of the westernmost homesteads in New South Wales.

History
Tolarno Stations is on the traditional land of the Barkindji people.

The first selectors arrived in the Tolarno and Peppora region in the late 1830s and by the 1890s a small town had grown on near by Tolarno Station, that included, with outer offices, stores, stables, a blacksmith shop, saddlers shop, cart shed, chaff stores, shearing shed and shearers quarters, bachelors quarters and a large fruit and vegetable garden to feed the community.

A school was developed to educate the children station workers, and those on neighbouring stations. At its peak, the Station was also home to 3 hotels.

During the 1894 shearers strike, workers from the station were involved in a number of violent actions in Moorara Station (45 km downstream).

During the 2019 drought the station ran out of water amid fears of degraded water quality in the river.

See also
Ross T. Reid

References

Localities in New South Wales
Stations (Australian agriculture)